A 2017 umbrella review of meta-analyses found that drinking coffee is generally safe within usual levels of intake and is more likely to improve health outcomes than to cause harm at doses of 3 or 4 cups of coffee daily. Exceptions include possible increased risk in women having bone fractures, and a possible increased risk in pregnant women of fetal loss or decreased birth weight. Results were complicated by poor study quality, and differences in age, gender, health status, and serving size.

Digestion 
A 1999 review found that coffee does not cause indigestion, but may promote gastrointestinal reflux. Two reviews of clinical studies on people recovering from abdominal, colorectal, and gynecological surgery found that coffee consumption was safe and effective for enhancing postoperative gastrointestinal function.

Mortality 
In 2012, the National Institutes of Health–AARP Diet and Health Study found that higher coffee consumption was associated with lower risk of death, and that those who drank any coffee lived longer than those who did not. However the authors noted, "whether this was a causal or associational finding cannot be determined from our data." A 2014 meta-analysis found that coffee consumption (4 cups/day) was inversely associated with all-cause mortality (a 16% lower risk), as well as cardiovascular disease mortality specifically (a 21% lower risk from drinking 3 cups/day), but not with cancer mortality with exception being oral cancer mortality.
 
Additional meta-analyses corroborated these findings, showing that higher coffee consumption (2–4 cups per day) was associated with a reduced risk of death by all disease causes. An association of coffee drinking with reduced risk for death from various sources was confirmed by a widely cited prospective cohort study of ten European countries in 2017.

Cardiovascular disease 
Moderate coffee consumption is not a risk factor for coronary heart disease. A 2012 meta-analysis concluded that people who drank moderate amounts of coffee had a lower rate of heart failure, with the biggest effect found for those who drank more than four cups a day. A 2014 meta-analysis concluded that cardiovascular disease, such as coronary artery disease and stroke, is less likely with three to five cups of non-decaffeinated coffee per day, but more likely with over five cups per day. A 2016 meta-analysis showed that coffee consumption was associated with a reduced risk of death in patients who have had a myocardial infarction.

The effect of no or moderate daily consumption of coffee on risk for developing hypertension has been assessed in several reviews during the 21st century. A 2019 review found that one to two cups consumed per day had no effect on hypertension risk, whereas drinking three or more cups per day reduced the risk, a finding in agreement with a 2017 analysis which showed a 9% lower risk of hypertension with long-term consumption of up to seven cups of coffee per day. Another review in 2018 found that the risk of hypertension was reduced by 2% with each one cup per day increment of coffee consumption up to 8 cups per day, compared with people who did not consume any coffee. By contrast, a 2011 review had found that drinking one to three cups of coffee per day may pose a slightly increased risk of developing hypertension.

Atrial fibrillation 
The Women's Health Study showed an increased risk of atrial fibrillation with 2-3 cups/day of caffeinated coffee, but other studies found either no effect or a protective effect.

The 2021 European Society of Cardiology Guidelines on Cardiovascular Disease Prevention in Clinical Practice state: "Non-filtered coffee contains LDL-C-raising cafestol and kahweol, and may be associated with an up to 25% increased risk of ASCVD mortality by consumption of nine or more drinks a day. Non-filtered coffee includes boiled, Greek, and Turkish coffee and some espresso coffees. Moderate coffee consumption (3–4 cups per day) is probably not harmful, perhaps even moderately beneficial".

Parkinson's disease 
Meta-analyses have consistently found that long-term coffee consumption is associated with a lower risk of Parkinson's disease.

Type II diabetes 
In a systematic review and meta-analysis of 28 prospective observational studies, representing over one million participants, every additional cup of caffeinated and decaffeinated coffee consumed in a day was associated, respectively, with a 9% and 6% lower risk of type 2 diabetes.

Cancer 
Research on the effects of coffee consumption on cancer risk generally has indicated no effect or a slightly lower risk of cancer, particularly in the liver.

Liver disease 
Preliminary evidence indicates that coffee consumption may be protective against the progression of liver disease, although the possible mechanisms for such an effect remain unclear.

Mental health 
The UK National Health Service advises that avoiding coffee may reduce anxiety. In chronic psychiatric patients, Caffeine, the major active ingredient in coffee, is associated with anxiety. At high doses, typically greater than 300 mg, caffeine can both cause and worsen anxiety. For some people, discontinuing caffeine use can significantly reduce anxiety. Caffeine-induced anxiety disorder is a subclass of substance- or medication-induced anxiety disorder. Populations that may be most impacted by caffeine consumption are adolescents and those already suffering anxiety disorders. Preliminary research indicated the possibility of a beneficial relationship between coffee intake and reduced depression. Long-term preliminary research, including assessment of symptoms for dementia and cognitive impairment, was inconclusive for coffee having an effect in the elderly, mainly due to the poor quality of the studies.

References 

Coffee
Coffee
Coffee
Caffeine